Aldus Corporation was an American software company best known for its pioneering desktop publishing (DTP) software. PageMaker, the company's most well-known product, ushered in the modern era of desktop computers such as the Macintosh seeing widespread use in the publishing industry. Paul Brainerd, the company's co-founder, coined the term desktop publishing to describe this paradigm. The company also originated the Tag Image File Format (TIFF) file format, widely used in the digital graphics profession.

Aldus was founded by Brainerd (who also served as chairman of the company's board), Jeremy Jaech, Mark Sundstrom, Mike Templeman, and Dave Walter. It was founded in Seattle, Washington, in 1984 and was acquired by Adobe Systems a decade later.

The company is named after 15th-century Venetian printer Aldus Manutius.

History
PageMaker was released in July 1985 and relied on Adobe's PostScript page description language. For output, it used the Apple LaserWriter, a PostScript laser printer. PageMaker for the PC was released in 1986, but by then the Mac was the de facto DTP platform, with Adobe Illustrator (released in 1987) and Adobe Photoshop (released in 1990) completing the suite of graphic design software.

In 1988, Aldus went on to offer its Illustrator-like program FreeHand, licensed from Altsys (which also developed Fontographer). FreeHand and Illustrator competed with each other for years through multiple releases. This rivalry continued even after the Aldus acquisition, because FreeHand was not included, but Adobe eventually acquired Freehand in 2005 with its acquisition of Macromedia. FreeHand MX was the last version offered by Adobe but is no longer sold or updated.

In early 1990, Aldus bought Silicon Beach Software, acquiring a number of consumer titles for the Macintosh, including SuperPaint, Digital Darkroom, SuperCard, Super3D, and Personal Press (later renamed Adobe Home Publisher). Silicon Beach was located in San Diego, California, and became the Aldus Consumer Division.

In 1993, Aldus bought After Hours Software and incorporated its products, TouchBase Pro and DateBook Pro, into the Aldus Consumer Division. The same year, it acquired Company of Science and Art (CoSA).

During the 1990s, QuarkXPress steadily won ground from PageMaker, and it seemed increasingly odd that Adobe — which had created PostScript, so vital to the working of DTP — still did not offer its own page layout application. This was resolved in September 1994 when Adobe purchased Aldus for $446 million. After two more major releases, PageMaker was discontinued in 2001 and is no longer supported; existing PageMaker customers were urged to switch to InDesign, released in 1999.

Aldus developed the TIFF and OPI industry standards. The three founders of Visio Corporation left Aldus in 1990 to create the product which later became known as Microsoft Office Visio.

Company name
"Paul Brainerd and his partners decided to name their company Aldus, after Aldus Pius Manutius (Teobaldo Mannucci) (1449–1515), a famous fifteenth-century Venetian pioneer in publishing, known for standardizing the rules of punctuation and also presenting several typefaces, including the first italic. Manutius went on to found the first modern publishing house, the Aldine Press."

Products

Print publishing
PageMaker — A desktop publishing program

Prepress
ColorCentral — An OPI server
PressWise — A digital imposition program
PrintCentral — A print output spooler
TrapWise — A digital trapping program

Graphics
FreeHand — A vector drawing program
Gallery Effects
Persuasion — A presentation program
PhotoStyler — A bitmap image editor
TextureMaker — A program for creating textures/patterns
SuperPaint — Painting and vector drawing program
Intellidraw — A powerful yet simple drawing program

Aldus Interactive Publishing/CoSA
After Effects — A digital motion graphics and compositing program
Hitchcock — A professional non-linear video editor, with titling and A/V transitions
Fetch — A multimedia database

Aldus Consumer Division 
(formerly Silicon Beach Software and After Hours Software)

Digital Darkroom photo enhancement software
Personal Press consumer desktop publishing software
DateBook Pro — Calendar management software
IntelliDraw — A vector drawing program
Super3D — 3D modeling software
SuperCard multimedia authoring environment
TouchBase Pro — Contact management software

References

External links

Logo of Aldus Corporation. An article on typography briefly discussing the origin of the Aldus logo.
Printed material related to Aldus products

Software companies disestablished in 1994
Software companies established in 1984
Defunct companies based in Seattle
Defunct software companies of the United States
1984 establishments in Washington (state)
1994 disestablishments in Washington (state)
1994 mergers and acquisitions